"As I Am" is a song by Canadian singer Justin Bieber, featuring vocals from American singer-songwriter Khalid. It was released through Def Jam Recordings on March 19, 2021, as the third track from Bieber's sixth studio album, Justice. Bieber and Khalid wrote the song with producers The Monsters & Strangerz, German, Josh Gudwin, alongside co-producer Ido Zmishlany and  Scott Harris and Aldae.

Background and composition
"As I Am" is a pop ballad set in the key of B major and has a moderate tempo of 100 beats per minute. The song marks the first collaboration between Justin Bieber and Khalid. The "soulful and hopeful" song serves as "a sweet reminder of being grateful for the people who love you even when you are not perfect". The "high-pitched synth and intense percussion" develop into the "upbeat, catchy chorus".

On March 19, 2021, in an interview with Vogue, Bieber spoke on the nature of the song and revealed that it was about the promises that he made to his wife Hailey Baldwin: I love this song because it has a really hopeful message. A lot of us, including me at times, have felt unworthy of love and so [the hook] is saying, 'Take me as I am and I'll do the best that I can.' It's that commitment that I personally made to my wife. I'm here through thick and thin—this is me, take it or leave it.

Critical reception
Billboards Jason Lipshutz ranked "As I Am" as the twelfth-best song on Justice, opining that the pairing of Bieber and Khalid "plays out just as fans would have hoped" and that it "should be the first of several team-ups between the two". Craig Jenkins from Vulture wrote that the collaboration "fools you into thinking it's another muted ballad before knocking you over the head with a massive drop". Jennifer McClellan of USA Today thought that Khalid's vocals on the track were a "genius addition". Similarly, Chris Willman of Variety believed Khalid was one of several guest artists on Justice "who actually feel like they complement Bieber somehow". By contrast, Ali Shutler of The Daily Telegraph turned down Khalid's guest appearance on the song as unexciting. Uproxx's Bianca Gracie felt that the song was "a formulaic recreation of Believes poppier moments".

Credits and personnel
Credits adapted from Tidal.

 Justin Bieber – lead vocals, songwriting
 Khalid – featured vocals, songwriting
 The Monsters & Strangerz – production, songwriting, drums, programming
 Jordan K. Johnson – production, songwriting, drums, programming
 Stefan Johnson – production, vocal production, songwriting, drums, programming
 German – production, songwriting, bass, programming
 Josh Gudwin – production, songwriting, mixing, recording, vocal engineering, studio personnel
 Ido Zmishlany – co-production, songwriting, piano
 Scott Harris – songwriting
 Aldae – songwriting, background vocals
 Pierre-Luc Rioux – guitar
 Colin Leonard – mastering
 Denis Kosiak – recording
 Heidi Wang – recording, assistant mixing
 James Keeley – assistant recording

Charts

Certifications

References

2020s ballads
2021 songs
Justin Bieber songs
Khalid (singer) songs
Pop ballads
Song recordings produced by the Monsters & Strangerz
Songs written by Justin Bieber
Songs written by Khalid (singer)
Songs written by Jordan Johnson (songwriter)
Songs written by Stefan Johnson
Songs written by Scott Harris (songwriter)
Songs written by Gregory Hein